Whittlesford Parkway railway station is on the West Anglia Main Line serving the village of Whittlesford in Cambridgeshire, England. Its three-letter station code is WLF.

The station and all trains calling are operated by Greater Anglia.

It is also near to the villages of Sawston and Duxford and the Imperial War Museum Duxford. The 13th century Duxford Chapel is on the road just east of the station.

The station opened in 1845 and was rebuilt between 1877 and 1890.

In 2007 it was renamed from Whittlesford to Whittlesford Parkway.

Services
All services at Whittlesford Parkway are operated by Greater Anglia using  EMUs and  bi-mode trains.

The typical off-peak service in trains per hour is:
 2 tph to London Liverpool Street (1 semi-fast, 1 stopping)
 1 tph to 
 2 tph to 
 1 tph to  via 

References

External links

Railway stations in Cambridgeshire
DfT Category E stations
Former Great Eastern Railway stations
Greater Anglia franchise railway stations
Railway stations in Great Britain opened in 1845